Caroline O'Shea (born 30 December 1960) is an Irish middle-distance runner. She competed in the women's 800 metres at the 1984 Summer Olympics.

References

1960 births
Living people
Athletes (track and field) at the 1984 Summer Olympics
Irish female middle-distance runners
Olympic athletes of Ireland
Place of birth missing (living people)